The 2012 New Hampshire Republican presidential primary took place on Tuesday, January 10, 2012. Former Massachusetts Governor Mitt Romney won the primary.

Background and campaign
In the 2008 Republican nomination contest, Mitt Romney's campaign invested heavily in the New Hampshire, but ultimately came up short to eventual nominee John McCain.

In 2012, Romney, Texas Congressman Ron Paul, former Utah Governor Jon Huntsman, former Speaker of the House Newt Gingrich, and former Pennsylvania Senator Rick Santorum were heavily contesting and campaigning in the New Hampshire primary. 

Though Santorum ultimately won the Iowa Caucus on January 3, it was believed at the time that Romney had won by 8 votes.

Televised debates in New Hampshire were held on January 7, 2012, on ABC News at Saint Anselm College and the following morning on January 8, 2012, on NBC's Meet the Press and MSNBC. All major Republican candidates attended both debates.

Ballot
In 2012, a record 33 Republican candidates filed to appear on the ballot in New Hampshire, including various single-issue activists, protest candidates, and perennial candidates. For instance, Stewart Greenleaf, who had no interest in becoming President, registered for the ballot to promote the issue of government spending in the Republican Party. Under New Hampshire's lenient ballot access laws, a candidate is only required to pay $1,000 to the state's treasury, and needs no party approval or petitions for placement.

Endorsements

Newspapers
Various newspapers that circulate widely in New Hampshire made endorsements ahead of the New Hampshire primary. While the conservative Union Leader, the only statewide newspaper, endorsed Gingrich, various newspapers endorsed Huntsman, with the Valley News stating that Huntsman was "a candidate whose views are solidly conservative, but not myopically so" and criticizing Romney and Gingrich, stating that "The former has raised the flip-flop to an art form, while the latter has done the same for hypocrisy" and endorsing Huntsman "in the hopes that the cooler heads will prevail in New Hampshire and elsewhere." Romney also received support, including from the Portsmouth Herald of the Seacoast Region.

The New Hampshire Union Leader endorsed Gingrich on November 27.
Foster's Daily Democrat endorsed Romney on December 4.
The Portsmouth Herald and Seacoast Media Group endorsed Romney on December 18.
The Keene Sentinel endorsed Huntsman on December 18.
The Valley News endorsed Huntsman on December 18.
The Conway Daily Sun endorsed Romney on December 21.
The Concord Monitor endorsed Huntsman on December 22.
The Boston Herald endorsed Romney.
The Salmon Press Newspapers group (the Littleton Courier, Berlin Reporter, and Coos County Democrat) endorsed Paul on January 4.
The Nashua Telegraph endorsed Romney on January 5.
The Boston Globe endorsed Huntsman on January 6.
The Eagle-Tribune endorsed Romney on January 6.

State politicians
Romney led the field in endorsements from New Hampshire Republican elected officials. The New York Times reported that after losing New Hampshire in the 2008 primary to John McCain, Romney devoted considerable time and money to gain the support of New Hampshire Republican figures. Romney's political action committee (PAC) "spread thousands of dollars" to New Hampshire Republican campaigns, including that of youthful Republican state Representative D.J. Bettencourt of the Republican-heavy Salem area, elected state House majority leader in 2011, who is one of Romney's most active supporters. Romney's PAC also donated $25,000 to the New Hampshire Republican State Committee under the chairmanship of prominent New Hampshire party player John H. Sununu, a former governor and White House Chief of Staff. Republican candidates for state Senate and state House, small-town Republican committees, and county sheriffs and district attorneys were all "recipients of [Romney's] largesse." Romney was criticized by some as "buying" endorsements, who referenced "blatantly transactional terms that lie behind the announcements." A large number of officials endorsing Romney, in New Hampshire and in other early primary states, had received contributions first.

By December 11, Romney had already received the endorsement of Ted Gatsas, mayor of Manchester (New Hampshire's largest city) and former state Senate president, and 58 endorsements from state representatives. According to prominent Romney supporter Thomas D. Rath, a former state attorney general described as a Republican power broker, on the eve of the primary the Romney campaign had been endorsed by 11 of 19 Republicans in the State Senate, 73 or 74 of the Republican state representatives, and eight of the 10 sheriffs, as well as the mayor of the largest city. The New York Times reported that so many officials endorsed Romney that it took a three-page pamphlet mailed to New Hampshire Republicans to list them all. The Times reported that Romney-supporting officials "introduce him at virtually every campaign stop, flood gyms and seniors centers with crowds on short notice and attack his Republican rivals."

New Hampshire House Speaker William L. (Bill) O'Brien endorsed Gingrich, while former House speakers George Roberts, Howard Burns, John Tucker, Donna Sytek, and Doug Scamman endorsed Romney.  State Senators Jim Forsythe, Andy Sanborn, and Ray White endorsed Ron Paul.

Federal politicians
Of the three Republicans in New Hampshire's congressional delegation, Senator Kelly Ayotte and Representative Charles Bass endorsed Romney, while Frank Guinta declined to endorse a candidate. Executive Council members Raymond S. Burton (who has represented northern New Hampshire since the 1970s), Christopher T. Sununu, and Raymond Wieczorek; State Senate Majority Leader Jeb Bradley, state Senators David Boutin, John Barnes, Jr., Jim Rausch, and Chuck Morse; and former state Senate President Tom Eaton endorsed Romney before December 7. Douglas Dutile, the sheriff of Grafton County, also endorsed Romney.

Senator John McCain of Arizona, who won the New Hampshire Republican primary in 2000 and 2008 and was the Republican nominee for president in 2008, endorsed Romney following the Iowa caucuses and ahead of the New Hampshire primary at a Manchester rally on January 4, despite prior tension between the two in the 2008 primary race.

Tea Party
After Iowa but before the New Hampshire primaries, tea party movement-aligned Buffalo, New York businessman Carl Paladino, the 2010 gubernatorial candidate in nearby New York, supported Gingrich and sharply criticized the rest of the candidates.

Rick Santorum's endorsements
Notably, former PA Sen. Rick Santorum gained a disproportionately high number of endorsements (when compared to his pre-Iowa polling in the single digits) in the run up to and including the NH Primary.  At one point Santorum led the entire field of GOP candidates in total number of endorsements (until the entrance of Romney and Perry), and finished with more endorsees than even Huntsman who finished third in the race. This was due in large part to the efforts of Santorum's State Co-chairs: Rep. Dan Tamburello, a current member of the NH House of Representatives from Londonderry who spearheaded the effort, Hon. Bill Cahill, a former Governor's Councilor and member of the NH House, and Claira Monier, a notable Republican party activist who was instrumental in Reagan's NH victory in 1980. Sen Santorum's national campaign manager was by Mike Biundo, who was the architect of former Manchester mayor Frank Guinta's surprising 2010 primary upset for the NH 1st Congressional district; Guinta went on to win the NH-1 district in November 2010 in a decisive victory over Democrat Carol-Shea Porter, who never conceded the race. Other notable endorsements for the Senator included Sen. Jim Luther, Sen. Fenton Groen, former candidate for Governor Karen Testerman, Rep Susan DeLemus, and NH Tea-Party luminary Jerry DeLemus. Testerman and the DeLemus' endorsed Rick after having defected from the Bachmann camp.

Polling

Result

Delegates were awarded to candidates who got 10% or more of the vote proportionally.

References

2012 New Hampshire elections
New Hampshire
2012